The 1964–65 Scottish Inter-District Championship was a rugby union competition for Scotland's district teams.

This season saw the 12th Scottish Inter-District Championship.

South and Glasgow District shared the competition with 2 wins.

1964-65 League Table

Results

Round 1

South: J. H. Gray (Hawick), C. Elliot (Langholm), R. Welsh (Hawick), P. B. Townsend (Gala), M. Fairbairn (Melrose), J. Turner (Gala),A. J. Hastie (Melrose), N. Suddon (Hawick), F. A. L. Laidlaw (Melrose), P. Robertson (Hawick), W. J. Hunter (Hawick), R. W. Brydon (Hawick),Tommy Elliot (Langholm), J. W. Telfer (Melrose), A. A. Carson (Gala)

Glasgow District: J. H. Roxburgh (Jordanhill RFC), R. A. Speedman (Glasgow University), W. A. Burnet (West of Scotland),G. M. Simmers (Glasgow Academicals), A. I. Hardie (Glasgow Academicals), B. M. Simmers (Glasgow Academicals),Dick Allan (Hutcheson's GSFP), J. McLaughlan (Jordanhill RFC), J. M. Kerr (Hutcheson's GSFP), I. V. Douglas (Hillhead HSFP),A. B. Carmichael (West of Scotland), C. S. Bisset (Jordanhill RFC), J. Buchanan (Jordanhill RFC), J. C. Mackenzie (Hillhead HSFP),W. S. Unkles (Glasgow HSFP)

Matches outwith the Championship

North of Scotland District: 

Midlands District: 

Glasgow District: 

Glasgow Select:

References

1964–65 in Scottish rugby union
Scottish Inter-District Championship seasons